Kuch Toh Hai: Naagin Ek Naye Rang Mein is an Indian Hindi-language supernatural, fantasy, thriller television series produced by Balaji Telefilms. It was the spin-off series of Naagin 5. It starred Krishna Mukherjee and Harsh Rajput.

Plot
The story is about Rehan and Priya, who are completely different from each other. 

Rehan is extraordinary and lives like a human despite not being one. He likes darkness and hates light as he is a cursed Vampire, due to their parents, Veer, an eagle, and Sarvashresth Aadi Naagin Bani's forbidden union and searches for love which he never finds. Priya is a half-human, half-fairy. She has some incredible powers. The two meet in Mussoorie when Rehan returns to India to learn the truth behind his supernatural identity while Priya arrives there to search for her long-lost parents. They feel attracted to each other but hide their real selves. Priya starts living in the Khurana's mansion unaware that they are her real family. Rageshwari, Priya's estranged mother, knowing their powers and their destiny, tries to separate Priya from Rehan, believing that he might harm her. Meanwhile, Rehan and Priya repeatedly cross paths and sense connections. Priya learns from Rageshwari that she is her mother and Farishta is her father. She decides to keep this a secret in order to not ruin her mother's respect in front of her family.

Rehan gets his ultimate vampire powers. Priya learns of Rehan's identity after seeing him in his true form. He unwillingly attacks her but fails. He realizes that something is preventing him from harming her. The next day being a full moon day is when Rehan will completely transform into an Aadishaat. Meanwhile, Swati and Arnav's engagement takes place. Priya thinks that she should reveal Rehan's truth in front of everyone but Rageshwari locks her in a room, fearing Rehan might harm Priya to become more powerful. It is also announced that Soumya and Mohit's engagement will also take place on the same day. But Mohit hesitates to make Soumya wear the ring and reveals to everyone that he loves Priya, to their surprise. Rehan goes to confront Priya about her relationship with Mohit.

Rehan apologises to Priya for scaring her and expresses his deep love for his sister, Soumya. He also discusses her love for Mohit. As Priya says she has no feelings for Mohit, Rehan asks for her help to make Mohit aware of the truth. He convinces her to agree to his fake marriage proposal to keep Mohit away from her. She agrees on the condition that Rehan shouldn't hurt her family. Rehan thanks her and takes her home where he proposes her. But Priya disagrees and says that she loves Mohit, upon being blackmailed by a stranger named Ajnabi who held Rageshwari hostage. This ruins their plan and his unknowing sister's life and angers Rehan. So he takes Priya to a jungle and kills her. He then becomes an Aadishaat and acquires uncontrollable powers which cause him to forget the murder. Rageshwari takes Priya's dead body to a mysterious place and pleads for her revival.

Upon her request, Shivanya's, Shivangi's, Bela's, Brinda's, and Bani's poison are given to Priya as an antidote for Rehan's bite. Priya is resurrected and transforms into a naagin with powers equal to Rehan. Meanwhile, Rehan tries to remember the night he took her to the jungle. Priya decides to take revenge on Rehan for killing her. Thus, she returns to his mansion and tricks Mohit to marry her. Rehan threatens Mohit and asks him to marry Soumya. He senses Priya around him and searches the mansion for her. He finally sees her disguised as a bride, hiding Soumya and taking her place. He locks Mohit in a room and impersonates him. Rehan and Priya are then married. The others are shocked when they see Priya. Upon Rehan's insistence, they agree to let Priya stay in their house. Rageshwari is killed by Pam and Soumya and they are revealed to be the main villains. After a series of events, Priya gets to the truth and Soumya is killed by Pam. Pam takes Rehan with her to kill him so that she can obtain his powers but Priya saves him and they both kill Pam. Rehan and Priya mutually decide to try to make their relationship work and reunite with each other.

Cast

Main
 Krishna Mukherjee as Priya Singhania/Raheja: A naagin from Sheshnaag clan, Initially, A hybrid human-fairy raised in an orphanage; Rageshwari and Farishta's daughter; Swati, Arushi and Roohi's half-sister, Rehan's wife. Rehan kills her when he becomes an Aadi Shaat but she is resurrected and receives Naagin powers; Veer and Bani's daughter-in-law.
 Harsh Rajput as Rehan Singhania/Raheja: A cursed Aadi Shaat, Veer and Bani's son, Pam and Shashank's adoptive son, Soumya, Arnav and Mini's adoptive brother, Priya's husband.

Recurring
 Resham Tipnis as Rageshwari Khurana: Siddharth's wife, Priya, Swati, Arushi and Roohi's mother, Farishta's ex-girlfriend and Bani's former friend
 Manini Mishra as Pam Raheja : Shashank's wife, Arnav, Mini and Soumya's mother, Rehan's adoptive mother.
 Rakhi Sawant as Mohini: A naagin from Kaal Kuth clan, helper of Pam, killed by Vishaka. 
 Nibedita Pal as Roohi Khurana: Arushi and Swati's sister, Priya's half-sister.
 Naveen Saini as Siddharth Khurana: Rageshwari's husband, Priya's landlord and stepfather, Roohi, Swati and Arushi's father.
 Ankita Sahu as Swati Raheja nee Khurana : Roohi and Arushi's sister, Arnav's wife, Priya's half-sister.
 Himani Sahani as Soumya Raheja : Arnav and Mini's sister, Rehan's adoptive sister.
 Akshay Bindra as Arnav Raheja : Soumya and Mini's brother, Rehan's adoptive brother, Swati's husband.
 Kristina Patel as Mini: Soumya and Arnav's sister, Rehan's adoptive sister.
 Ujjwal Rana as Shashank Raheja : Pam's husband, Soumya, Arnav and Mini's father, Rehan's adoptive father.
 Neha Tomar as Arushi "Aru" Khurana: Roohi and Swati's sister, Priya's half-sister.
 Mohit Hiranandani as Mohit: Soumya's fiancé.
 Vedant Sharan as Dhruv: Priya's friend.
 Vaishali Thakkar as Priya's former guardian, head of orphanage.

Guest
 Arjit Taneja as Farishta: Priya's father, Rageshwari's former lover, Bani's helper.
 Surbhi Chandna as Bani Singhania: Aadinaagin, Veeranshu's wife, Rehan's mother, Priya's mother-in-law, Rageshwari's friend.

Reception 
Kuch Toh Hai - Naagin Ek Naye Rang Mein opened with an average TRP of 1.7 occupying 15th position in Hindi GEC urban however dropped in the following weeks.

References

External links 
 
 Kuch Toh Hai: Naagin Ek Naye Rang Mein on Colors TV
 Kuch Toh Hai on Voot

Balaji Telefilms television series
2021 Indian television series debuts
Indian fantasy television series
Indian drama television series
Colors TV original programming
Hindi-language television shows
Television shows set in Mumbai